The name Bridget has been used for three tropical cyclones in the Eastern Pacific Ocean and for one in the Australian region.

In the Eastern Pacific:
 Tropical Storm Bridget (1967), weakened as it approached the Mexican mainland
 Hurricane Bridget (1971), Category 2 hurricane that paralleled the Mexican coastline just offshore before making landfall southeast of Manzanillo, Colima
 Tropical Storm Bridget (1975), never came near land

In the Australian region:
 Cyclone Bridget (1969)

Pacific hurricane set index articles
Australian region cyclone set index articles